Edmund John Millington Synge (16 April 1871 – 24 March 1909) was an Irish playwright, poet, writer, collector of folklore, and a key figure in the Irish Literary Revival. His best known play The Playboy of the Western World was poorly received, due to its bleak ending, depiction of Irish peasants, and idealisation of parricide, leading to hostile audience reactions and riots in Dublin during its opening run at the Abbey Theatre, Dublin, which he had co-founded with W. B. Yeats and Lady Gregory. His other major works include In the Shadow of the Glen (1903), Riders to the Sea (1904), The Well of the Saints (1905), and The Tinker's Wedding (1909).

Although he came from a wealthy Anglo-Irish background, his writings mainly concern working-class Catholics in rural Ireland, and with what he saw as the essential paganism of their world view. Owing to his ill health, Synge was schooled at home. His early interest was in music, leading to a scholarship and degree at Trinity College Dublin, and he went to Germany in 1893 to study music. He abandoned this career path in 1894 with a move to Paris where he took up poetry and literary criticism and met Yeats, and then returned to Ireland. 

Synge suffered from Hodgkin's disease. He died aged 37 from Hodgkin's-related cancer, while writing what became Deirdre of the Sorrows, considered by some as his masterpiece, though unfinished during his lifetime. Although he left relatively few works, they are widely regarded as of high cultural significance.

Biography

Early life
Synge was born on 16 April 1871, in Newtown Villas, Rathfarnham, County Dublin, the youngest of eight children of upper-middle-class Protestant parents. His father John Hatch Synge was a barrister, and came from a family of landed gentry in Glanmore Castle, County Wicklow. Synge's paternal grandfather, also named John Synge, was an evangelical Christian involved in the movement that became the Plymouth Brethren, and his maternal grandfather, Robert Traill, was a Church of Ireland rector in Schull, County Cork, who died in 1847 during the Great Irish Famine. He was a descendant of Edward Synge, Archbishop of Tuam, and Edward's son Nicholas, the Bishop of Killaloe. His nephews included mathematician John Lighton Synge and optical microscopy pioneer Edward Hutchinson Synge.<ref>[https://www.livingedition.at/en/isbn/9783901585173/ Review of The Life and Works of Edward Hutchinson Synge] Living Edition</ref>

Synge's father died from smallpox in 1872 at the age of 49. He was buried on his son's first birthday. His mother moved the family to the house next door to her own mother's house in Rathgar, County Dublin. Although often ill, Synge had a happy childhood there. He developed an interest in bird-watching along the banks of the River Dodder, and during family holidays at the seaside resort of Greystones, County Wicklow, and the family estate at Glanmore.

Synge was educated at home and at times at schools in Dublin and Bray, and later studied piano, flute, violin, music theory and counterpoint at the Royal Irish Academy of Music. He travelled to the continent to study music, but changed his mind and decided to focus on literature. He was a talented student and won a scholarship in counterpoint in 1891. The family moved to the suburb of Kingstown (now Dún Laoghaire) in 1888, and Synge entered Trinity College, Dublin, the following year. He graduated with a bachelor's degree in 1892, having studied Irish and Hebrew, as well as continuing his music studies and playing with the Academy Orchestra in the Antient Concert Rooms. Between November 1889 and 1894 he took private music lessons with Robert Prescott Stewart.

Synge later developed an interest in Irish antiquities and the Aran Islands, and became a member of the Irish League for a year. He left the League because, as he told Maud Gonne, "my theory of regeneration for Ireland differs from yours ... I wish to work on my own for the cause of Ireland, and I shall never be able to do so if I get mixed up with a revolutionary and semi-military movement." In 1893 he published his first known work, a poem influenced by Wordsworth, Kottabos: A College Miscellany.

Early work
After graduating, Synge moved to Germany to study music. He stayed in Coblenz during 1893 and moved to Würzburg in January 1894. Owing partly to his shyness about performing in public, and partly to his doubt about his ability, he decided to abandon music and pursue his literary interests. He returned to Ireland in June 1894, and moved to Paris in January 1895 to study literature and languages at the Sorbonne.

He met Cherrie Matheson during summer breaks with his family in Dublin. He proposed to her in 1895 and again the next year, but she turned him down on both occasions because of their differing views on religion. This rejection affected Synge greatly and reinforced his determination to spend as much time as possible outside Ireland.

In 1896, he visited Italy to study the language before returning to Paris. He planned on making a career in writing about French authors for the English press. In that same year he met W. B. Yeats, who encouraged him to live for a while in the Aran Islands, and then return to Dublin and devote himself to creative work. In 1899 he joined with Yeats, Augusta, Lady Gregory, and George William Russell to form the Irish National Theatre Society, which later established the Abbey Theatre. He wrote some pieces of literary criticism for Gonne's Irlande Libre and other journals, as well as unpublished poems and prose in a decadent fin de siècle style. (These writings were eventually gathered in the 1960s for his Collected Works.) He also attended lectures at the Sorbonne by the noted Celtic scholar Henri d'Arbois de Jubainville.

Aran Islands and first plays

In 1897, Synge suffered his first attack of Hodgkin's, after which an enlarged gland was removed from his neck. He visited Lady Gregory's home, at Coole Park near Gort, County Galway, where he met Yeats again and also Edward Martyn. He spent the following five summers there, collecting stories and folklore, perfecting his Irish, but living in Paris for most of the rest of each year. He also visited Brittany regularly. During this period he wrote his first play, When the Moon Has Set which he sent to Lady Gregory for the Irish Literary Theatre in 1900, but she rejected it. The play was not published until it appeared in his Collected Works.

Synge's first account of life on the Aran Islands was published in the New Ireland Review in 1898 and his book, The Aran Islands, completed in 1901 and published in 1907 with illustrations by Jack Butler Yeats. Synge considered the book "my first serious piece of work". Lady Gregory read the manuscript and advised Synge to remove any direct naming of places and to add more folk stories, but he declined to do either because he wanted to create something more realistic. The book conveys Synge's belief that beneath the Catholicism of the islanders it was possible to detect a substratum of the pagan beliefs of their ancestors. His experiences in the Arans formed the basis for the plays about Irish rural life that Synge went on to write.

Synge left Paris for London in 1903. He had written two one-act plays, Riders to the Sea and The Shadow of the Glen, the previous year. These met with Lady Gregory's approval and The Shadow of the Glen was performed at the Molesworth Hall in October 1903. Riders to the Sea was staged at the same venue in February the following year. The Shadow of the Glen, under the title In the Shadow of the Glen, formed part of the bill for the opening run of the Abbey Theatre from 27 December 1904 to 3 January 1905. Both plays were based on stories that Synge had collected in the Arans, and Synge relied on props from the Arana to help set the stage for each of them. He also relied on Hiberno-English, the English dialect of Ireland, to reinforce its usefulness as a literary language, partly because he believed that the Irish language could not survive.The Shadow of the Glen is based on a story about an unfaithful wife, and was criticised by the Irish nationalist leader Arthur Griffith as "a slur on Irish womanhood". Years later Synge wrote: "When I was writing The Shadow of the Glen some years ago I got more aid than any learning could have given me from a chink in the floor of the old Wicklow house where I was staying, that let me hear what was being said by the servant girls in the kitchen." Griffith's criticism encouraged more attacks alleging that Synge described Irish women in an unfair manner. Riders to the Sea was also attacked by nationalists, this time including Patrick Pearse, who decried it because of the author's attitude to God and religion. Pearse, Arthur Griffith and other conservative-minded Catholics claimed Synge had done a disservice to Irish nationalism by not idealising his characters, but later critics have stated he idealised the Irish peasantry too much. A third one-act play, The Tinker's Wedding, was drafted around this time, but Synge initially made no attempt to have it performed, largely because of a scene in which a priest is tied up in a sack, which, as he wrote to the publisher Elkin Mathews in 1905, would probably upset "a good many of our Dublin friends".

When the Abbey Theatre was established, Synge was appointed literary adviser and became one of the directors, along with Yeats and Lady Gregory. He differed from Yeats and Lady Gregory on what he believed the Irish theatre should be, as he wrote to Stephen MacKenna:I do not believe in the possibility of "a purely fantastic, unmodern, ideal, breezy, spring-dayish, Cuchulainoid National Theatre" ... no drama can grow out of anything other than the fundamental realities of life, which are never fantastic, are neither modern nor unmodern and, as I see them, rarely spring-dayish, or breezy or Cuchulanoid.

Synge's next play, The Well of the Saints, was staged at the Abbey in 1905, again to nationalist disapproval, and then in 1906 at the Deutsches Theater in Berlin. The critic Joseph Holloway asserted that the play combined "lyric and dirt".

Playboy riots and after

Synge's widely regarded masterpiece, The Playboy of the Western World, was first performed on 26 January 1907, at the Abbey Theatre. A comedy about apparent patricide, it attracted a hostile reaction from sections of the Irish public. The Freeman's Journal described it as "an unmitigated, protracted libel upon Irish peasant men, and worse still upon Irish girlhood". Arthur Griffith, who believed that the Abbey Theatre was insufficiently politically committed, described the play as "a vile and inhuman story told in the foulest language we have ever listened to from a public platform", and perceived a slight on the virtue of Irish womanhood in the line "... a drift of chosen females, standing in their shifts ..." At the time, a shift was known as a symbol representing Kitty O'Shea and her adulterous relationship with Charles Stuart Parnell. 

A section of the audience at the opening rioted, causing the third act to be acted out in dumbshow. The disturbances continued for a week, interrupting the following performances. Yeats said the audience had "disgraced yourselves again. Is this to be an ever-recurring celebration of the arrival of Irish genius? Synge first and then O'Casey?"

Although the writing of The Tinker's Wedding began at the same time as Riders to the Sea and In the Shadow of the Glen, it took Synge five years to complete, and was not finished in 1907. Riders was performed in the Racquet Court theatre in Galway on 4–8 January 1907, but not performed again until 1909, and only then in London. The first critic to respond to the play was Daniel Corkery, who said, "One is sorry Synge ever wrote so poor a thing, and one fails to understand why it ever should have been staged anywhere."

Death
Synge died from Hodgkin lymphoma at the Elpis Nursing Home in Dublin on 24 March 1909, aged 37, and was buried in Mount Jerome Cemetery, Harold's Cross, Dublin. A collected volume, Poems and Translations, with a preface by Yeats, was published by the Cuala Press on 8 April 1909. Yeats and actress and one-time fiancée Molly Allgood (Maire O'Neill) completed Synge's unfinished final play, Deirdre of the Sorrows, and it was presented by the Abbey players on Thursday 13 January 1910, with Allgood as Deirdre.

Personality
John Masefield, who knew Synge, wrote that he "gave one from the first the impression of a strange personality". Masefield said that Synge's view of life originated in his poor health. In particular, Masefield said "His relish of the savagery made me feel that he was a dying man clutching at life, and clutching most wildly at violent life, as the sick man does".

Yeats described Synge as timid and shy, who "never spoke an unkind word" yet his art could "fill the streets with rioters". Richard Ellmann, the biographer of Yeats and James Joyce, stated that Synge "built a fantastic drama out of Irish life. 

Yeats described Synge in the poem "In Memory of Major Robert Gregory":
...And that enquiring man John Synge comes next,
That dying chose the living world for text
And never could have rested in the tomb
But that, long travelling, he had come
Towards nightfall upon certain set apart
In a most desolate stony place,
Towards nightfall upon a race
Passionate and simple like his heart.

Synge was a political radical, immersed in the socialist literature of William Morris, and in his own words "wanted to change things root and branch". Much to the consternation of his mother, he went to Paris in 1896 to become more involved in radical politics, and his interest in the topic lasted until his dying days when he sought to engage his nurses on the topic of feminism.

Legacy

Yeats said that Synge was "the greatest dramatic genius of Ireland". While Yeats and Lady Gregory were "the centerpieces of the Irish theatrical renaissance, it was Synge ... who gave the movement it national quality ..." His plays helped set the dominant style at the Abbey Theatre until the 1940s. The stylised realism of his writing was reflected in the training given at the theatre's school of acting, and plays of peasant life were the main staple of the repertoire until the end of the 1950s. Sean O'Casey, the next major dramatist to write for the Abbey, knew Synge's work well and attempted to do for the Dublin working classes what Synge had done for the rural poor. Brendan Behan, Brinsley MacNamara, and Lennox Robinson were all indebted to Synge.

The Irish literary critic Vivian Mercier was among the first to recognise Samuel Beckett's debt to Synge. Beckett was a regular member of the audience at the Abbey in his youth and particularly admired the plays of Yeats, Synge and O'Casey. Mercier points out parallels between Synge's casts of tramps, beggars and peasants and many of the figures in Beckett's novels and dramatic works.

Synge's cottage in the Aran Islands has been restored as a tourist attraction. An annual Synge Summer School has been held every summer since 1991 in the village of Rathdrum, County Wicklow. Synge is the subject of Mac Dara Ó Curraidhín's 1999 documentary film, Synge agus an Domhan Thiar (Synge and the Western World). Joseph O'Connor wrote a novel, Ghost Light (2010), loosely based on Synge's relationship with Molly Allgood.

Synge’s correspondence with his cousin, composer Mary Helena Synge, is archived at Trinity College Dublin.

Works
 In the Shadow of the Glen, 1903
 Riders to the Sea, 1904
 The Well of the Saints, 1905
 The Aran Islands, 1907 (The book at wikisource: The Aran Islands)
 The Playboy of the Western World, 1907
 The Tinker's Wedding, 1908
  Poems and Translations, 1909
 Deirdre of the Sorrows 1910
 In Wicklow and West Kerry, 1912
 Collected Works of John Millington Synge 4 vols, 1962–1968
 Volume 1 Poems, 1962
 Volume 2 Prose, 1966
 Volumes 3 and 4 Plays, 1968

Notes

References
 
 Corkery, Daniel. Synge and Anglo-Irish Literature. Cork University Press, 1931. 
 Dunne, Seán and George O'Brien. The Ireland Anthology. St. Martin's Press, 1997. 
 Ellmann, Richard. Yeats: The Man and the Masks. Macmillan, 1948.
 Ferriter, Diarmaid. The Transformation of Ireland 1900–2000. Profile Books, 2004. 94–95. 
 Foster, R.F., W.B. Yeats:  A Life. I: The Apprentice Mage 1864—1914. Oxford University Press, 1998.
 Gassner, John & Quinn, Edward. "The Reader's Encyclopedia of World Drama". Dover Publications, May 2002. 
 Greene, David H. & Stephens, Edward M. "J.M. Synge 1871–1909" (The MacMillan Company New York 1959)
 Greene, David. "J.M. Synge: A Reappraisal" in Critical Essays on John Millington Synge, ed. Daniel J. Casey, 15–27. New York: G. K. Hall & Co., 1994
 Grene, Nichola. "Synge: A Critical Study of His Plays". Lanham MD: Rowman and Littlefield, 1975. 
 Hogan, Robert and  O'Neill, Michael. Joseph Holloway's Abbey Theatre. Carbondale, Southern Illinois University Press, 1967.
 Johnston, Denis. "John Millington Synge", Columbia Essays on Modern Writers Series, #12. New York: Columbia University Press, 1965.
 Kiberd, Declan. Inventing Ireland: The Literature of the Modern Nation, Jonathan Cape, 1995.
 McCormack, W.J. "Synge, (Edmund) John Millington", Oxford Dictionary of National Biography, 2010.  
 Mikhail, E. H. (ed.). The Abbey Theatre: Interviews and Recollections, Rowman & Littlefield, 1987.
 Masefield, John. John M. Synge: A Few Personal Recollections With Biographical Notes, Netchworth: Garden City Press Ltd., 1916.
 Mercier, Vivian. Beckett/Beckett. Oxford: Oxford University Press, 1977. 
 Price, Alan. "Synge and Anglo-Irish Drama". London: Methuen, 1961.
 Price, Alan. "A Survey of Recent Work on J. M. Synge" in A Centenary Tribute to J. M. Synge 1871–1909. Ed. S. B. Bushrui. New York: Barnes & Noble, 1972. .
 Smith, Alison. "Introduction" in Collected Plays, Poems, and The Aran Islands. Ed. Alison Smith. London: Everyman, 1996.
 Synge, John Millington. Collected Works. Ed. Robin Skelton, Alan Price, and Ann Saddlemeyer. Gerrards Cross: Smythe, 1982. 
 Synge, John Millington. Some Letters of John M. Synge to Lady Gregory and W. B. Yeats. Cuala Press, 1971.
 Yeats, William Butler. The Autobiography of William Butler Yeats''. Macmillan, 1965.

External links

 
 
 
 John Millington Synge Collection at the Harry Ransom Center
 
 
 

1871 births
1909 deaths
University of Paris alumni
Abbey Theatre
Irish Anglicans
Irish male poets
Irish male dramatists and playwrights
Deaths from Hodgkin lymphoma
Deaths from cancer in Ireland
Alumni of Trinity College Dublin
People from Rathfarnham
Burials at Mount Jerome Cemetery and Crematorium
Alumni of the Royal Irish Academy of Music
19th-century Irish poets
19th-century Irish dramatists and playwrights
20th-century Irish poets
20th-century Irish dramatists and playwrights
20th-century male writers
19th-century male writers
John Millington